Satyajeet Patil is a Shiv Sena politician from Kolhapur district, Maharashtra. He is current Member of Legislative Assembly from Shahuwadi Vidhan Sabha constituency of Kolhapur, Maharashtra, India as a member of Shiv Sena. He has been elected for 2 terms in the Maharashtra Legislative Assembly for 2004 & 2014.

Positions held
 2004: Elected to Maharashtra Legislative Assembly (1st term)
 2014: Re-Elected to Maharashtra Legislative Assembly (2nd term)

References

External links
 Shiv Sena Home Page
 Kolhapur district public representatives

Living people
People from Kolhapur district
Maharashtra MLAs 2004–2009
Maharashtra MLAs 2014–2019
Shiv Sena politicians
Marathi politicians
1970 births